George Robert Gayre of Gayre and Nigg (6 August 1907 - 10 February 1996) was a Scottish anthropologist who founded Mankind Quarterly, a peer-reviewed academic journal which has been described as a "cornerstone of the scientific racism establishment". A self-proclaimed expert on heraldry, he also founded The Armorial, and produced many books on this subject.

Education and military service

Gayre was born as George Robert Gair on 6 August 1907 in Dublin to Robert William Gair (1875-1957), a confectioner, and Clara Hull or Hart, and in bogus pedigrees recorded in Ireland in 1950 and published between 1952 and 2003, he claimed that his father was the son of William Gillies Gair (1842-1906), a portrait painter born at Greenock in Scotland, but was actually the illegitimate son of the painter's sister Jessie Gair (died 1897) who, two years after the child's birth became the second wife of William Sutherland, of Glasgow, plasterer.  He earned an MA from University of Edinburgh, then studied at Exeter College, Oxford.

Gayre served with the British Expeditionary Force in France in 1939, as a Lieutenant-Colonel in the Royal Artillery afterwards becoming Educational Adviser to the Allied Military Government of Italy, based in Palermo, where he fought for the exclusion of left-wing text-books and communist influence from the Italian education system. He was thereafter Director of Education to the Allied Control Commission for Italy, based in Naples; and Chief of Education and Religious Affairs, German Planning Unit, Supreme Headquarters Allied Expeditionary Force. After the war he spent a considerable amount of time in India where he was instrumental in the establishment of the Italo-Indian Institute.

Heraldry

Gayre was author of books on heraldry. As Chief of Clan Gayre, Gayre appended "of Gayre and Nigg" becoming Grand Almoner, and Hereditary Commander of Lochore, of the Order of Saint Lazarus (statuted 1910).

His 1959 book Heraldic Standards and Other Ensigns: Their development and history is considered an important work on the subject, and he contributed on the topic to Encyclopædia Britannica.

Mankind Quarterly and publications on race

Gayre was one of the founders of Mankind Quarterly and an editor from 1960 to 1978. He was honorary editor-in-chief thereafter.

The magazine has been called a "cornerstone of the scientific racism establishment" and a "white supremacist journal", "scientific racism's keepers of the flame", a journal with a "racist orientation" and an "infamous racist journal", and "journal of 'scientific racism'".

In 1968 he testified on behalf of members of the Racial Preservation Society who were charged under the Race Relations Act for publishing racialist material. They prevailed in their defence. In his evidence to the court Gayre described blacks as being "feckless" and he maintained that scientific evidence showed that blacks "prefer their leisure to the dynamism which the white and yellow races show."

Titles, styles and controversies

Previous generations of Gayre's ancestors (in the female line) all used the spelling "Gair" as far back as the 17th century.  Gayre's university degree in the mid-1920s was likewise issued with the "Gair" spelling, but he began spelling it "Gayre" at least as early as 1943.   In 1957, after the death of his father, he changed his surname to "Gayre of Gayre and Nigg", a title that had never before been used.

Gayre claimed to be the Chief of "Clan Gayre" and "Clan Gayre and Nigg".  In 1947, he wrote a book titled Gayre's Booke: Being a History of the Family of Gayre  in which, without mentioning his illegitimate descent, he presented an ancestry that supposedly established his claim to be the chieftain of the Clan of Gayre; however no clan or sept by that name is mentioned in any record prior to Gayre's use of it in the second quarter of the 20th century.  World Orders of Knighthood and Merit by Guy Stair Sainty (published by Burke's Peerage) refers to Gayre as "...the late Robert Gayre (first Chief of the newly formed Clan Gayre)...".  The Glasgow Herald Newspaper, on 14 June 1975, wrote "Robert Gayre, of Gayre and Nigg, is singular among genealogists, dynasts and the like, if only for the reason that, alone among them, he has been able to create a Scottish clan from scratch, providing it with traditions, rituals, precedences and privileges..."

In 1967 Gayre established a Commandery of the Order of St Lazarus. In 1971 he bought St Vincent's Church. It became its collegiate church, the seat of the Commandery of Lochore. It was the first church to have been acquired by the Order of St Lazarus since the reformation. Gayre also claimed to be "Baron of Lochoreshire". This was not a title that Gayre inherited or was bestowed but rather one that he assumed after he purchased the seat of the feudal Barony of Lochore. Nor was the feudal Barony ever previously described as "Lochoreshire"; it was always the "Barony of Lochore", which was located within an area that was known in medieval times as Lochoreshire. Other titles and honours that he said he had include being Chamberlain to the Prince of Lippe (a prominent member of the Order of Saint Lazarus), Knight of the Sacred Military Constantinian Order of Saint George of Naples, Knight Commander of the Cross of Merit (Military Division) of the Sovereign Military Order of Malta, Knight Commander of the House Order of Lippe, Knight Grand Cross with Collar of the Military and Hospitaller Order of St. Lazarus of Jerusalem and Knight Grand Officer of the Order of the Crown of Italy.

In the early 1960s, Gayre was appointed "Commissioner-General of the English Tongue" of the Order of Saint Lazarus (statuted 1910), one of the many neo-chivalrous self-styled orders that arose in the early twentieth century.

In 1964, Gayre formed the International Commission on Orders of Chivalry (ICOC), an ostensibly academic but non-authoritative panel whose purpose was to review and approve of or reject claimed Orders of Chivalry. The Commission originally included many holders of legitimate titles and honours, but when it became evident that Gayre intended to bolster the legitimacy of the Order of St. Lazarus through the Commission's published Register, some of the original members resigned in protest.  The privately run and privately funded ICOC continued to act as a vehicle for promoting the cause of establishing the Order of St. Lazarus' legitimacy until Gayre's death in 1996.  In this, he was assisted by his friend, protege, fellow member of the Order of St. Lazarus, and Vice-President of the ICOC, Terence MacCarthy whose pedigree has been shown to be similarly bogus.

Nazi ties
In 1944 Gayre wrote Teuton and Slav on the Polish frontier: a diagnosis of the racial basis of the Germano-Polish borderlands, with suggestions for the settlement of German and Slav claims using photos by the Nazi Hans F. K. Günther and refers several times to "Professor Hans F.K. Günther's authoritative work on German racial science". Like Günther, he was a leading member of the post-war Neo-Nazi Northern League and according to Joseph L. Graves and others had close ties to other neo-Nazi organisations. Graves and William H. Tucker state that Gayre considered himself a Strasserist, an ideology "which emphasized the 'socialism' in National Socialism, rejecting both communism and capitalism as Jewish-dominated systems that had to be overthrown in favour of an approach based on white racial solidarity." He denied any links between Nazism and Mankind Quarterly while lamenting the identification by most of the word "Nazi" with "Hitlerian Nazi".

Publications on ancient Zimbabwe
Gayre wrote some articles and a book proposing a Semitic origin for Great Zimbabwe, maintaining that the Lemba are descended through their male line from the creators of the original Zimbabwean civilisation, and citing evidence including burial and circumcision practices. He suggested that the Shona artefacts which were found at Great Zimbabwe and in numerous other stone ruins nearby, were placed there only after they conquered the country and drove out or absorbed the previous inhabitants; he added that the ones who remained would probably have passed some of their skills and knowledge to the invaders.

According to Gayre, the agricultural terracing and irrigation channels in the Nyanga District of northeast of Zimbabwe was a product of the same ancient civilisation – as too were the hundreds of ancient gold mines in the country.

Most archaeologists disagree with Gayre's interpretation and conclusions: they maintain that Great Zimbabwe was constructed by ancestors of the Shona, as were the terraces, furrows and settlements of ancient Nyanga.

Selected bibliography
Teuton and Slav on the Polish Frontier: A diagnosis of the racial basis of the Germano-Polish borderlands, with suggestions for the settlement of German and Slav claims. Eyre and Spottiswoode (1944) ASIN: B0007J1KXK
Italy in Transition: Extracts from the private journal of G.R. Gayre. Faber and Faber Ltd (1946) ASIN: B0006DB91U
Gayre's Booke: Being a History of the Family of Gayre. Phillimore (1948) ASIN: B00069X8L8
Wassail! In Mazers of Mead: An Account of Mead, Metheglin, Sack and Other Ancient Liquors, and of the mazer cups out of which they were drunk, with some ... upon the drinking customs of our forebears. Phillimore (1948) ASIN: B0007IYD4O
Heraldic Standards and Other Ensigns: Their development and history. Oliver and Boyd (1959) ASIN: B0007IV3L0
The Nature of Arms: An Exposition of the Meaning and Significance of Heraldry with Special... 1961, Oliver and Boyd
The Nature of Arms: An Exposition of the Meaning and Significance of Heraldry with Special... 1961, Oliver and Boyd
Heraldic cadency: The development of differencing of coats of arms for kinsmen and other purposes. Foreword by the Duke of Salandra and Serracapriola. Faber and Faber (1961) ASIN: B0007IUYCE
The House of Gayre and an account of Minard castle. The Armorial (1960) ASIN: B0007KCG46
The Bantu homelands of the northern Transvaal Duquesne University Press (1962) ASIN: B0007ETDFWMore Ethnological elements of Africa. Armorial (1972) ASIN: B0007AILLSThe knightly twilight'', Lochore Enterprises Valletta 1973

References

1907 births
1996 deaths
Alumni of the University of Edinburgh
British white supremacists
Scottish anthropologists
Scottish people of Irish descent
Writers from Dublin (city)
Royal Artillery officers
Proponents of scientific racism
Scottish anti-communists
Recipients of the Order of Saint Lazarus (statuted 1910)